The Federal Correctional Institution, Big Spring (FCI Big Spring) is a low-security United States federal prison for male inmates in Texas. It is operated by the Federal Bureau of Prisons, a division of the United States Department of Justice. The facility also has a satellite prison camp which houses minimum-security male offenders.

FCI Big Spring is located in the city of Big Spring, Texas, midway between Dallas and El Paso.  The town is also the location of the privately owned and operated Big Spring Correctional Center, which contracts with the FBOP to house federal detainees at four physical locations.  Both FCI Big Spring and the BSCC occupy buildings and facilities repurposed from the closed Webb Air Force Base.

Notable incidents
While they occur less frequently than at high-security prisons, serious acts of violence also occur at low-security institutions such as FCI Big Spring. On March 6, 2008, FCI Big Spring Correction Officer Terry Lloyd was conducting a search of inmate lockers when inmate Ray Ramirez-Bueno, 45, pushed his locker door shut on Officer Lloyd's right hand, causing Lloyd to suffer a minor injury. When additional correction officers responded to the incident, Ramirez-Bueno refused to submit to hand restraints, assumed a fighting stance, and threatened to kill the officers if they touched him. After a period of negotiation, Ramirez-Bueno agreed to be escorted to a lieutenant's office, where he submitted to hand restraints and sent to the facility's Special Housing Unit, where inmates who pose security risks are held. Ramirez-Bueno was subsequently convicted of assaulting a federal officer on March 11, 2009 and had several years added to his original sentence. He was transferred to the Federal Correctional Institution, Forrest City Low, a low-security prison in Arkansas, and is scheduled for release in 2024.

Notable inmates (current and former)

See also

List of U.S. federal prisons
Federal Bureau of Prisons
Incarceration in the United States

References

Buildings of the United States government in Texas
Prisons in Texas
Buildings and structures in Howard County, Texas
Big Spring
1979 establishments in Texas